Jalšovík is a village and municipality in the Krupina District of the Banská Bystrica Region of Slovakia.

History
It arose in 1902 for the union of Dolný and Horný Jalšovík.
Dolný and Horný  Jalšovík in historical records  were first mentioned in 1542 as belonging to Bzovík castle. After on, they passed to local noble families: Szelény, Bory, Balogy.

Genealogical resources

The records for genealogical research are available at the state archive "Statny Archiv in Banska Bystrica, Slovakia"

 Roman Catholic Church records (births/marriages/deaths): 1686-1895 (parish B)

See also
 List of municipalities and towns in Slovakia

References

External links
 
https://web.archive.org/web/20071027094149/http://www.statistics.sk/mosmis/eng/run.html
http://www.e-obce.sk/obec/jalsovik/jalsovik.html
https://web.archive.org/web/20070621044409/http://www.regionhont.sk/index.php?session=0&action=read&click=open&article=1103473843
Surnames of living people in Jalsovik

Villages and municipalities in Krupina District